Rajah Buayan Air Station is a Military airbase located in the Southern island of the Philippines, in the city of General Santos, South Cotabato, Philippines. It previously served as the airport for General Santos until the opening of General Santos International Airport in 1996.

References

See also
 General Santos International Airport

Air force installations of the Philippines
Buildings and structures in General Santos